Dubrovsky is a rural locality (a settlement) in Kirovsky Selsoviet, Aleysky District, Altai Krai, Russia. The population was 45 as of 2013. There are 2 streets.

Geography 
Dubrovsky is located 27 km north of Aleysk (the district's administrative centre) by road. Krasnodubrovsky is the nearest rural locality.

References 

Rural localities in Aleysky District